Joseph A. Komonchak (born on March 13, 1939) is a Catholic priest and theologian, ordained on 18 December 1963 for the Archdiocese of New York. He is Professor Emeritus of the School of Theology and Religious Studies at the Catholic University of America, where he retired in 2009.

Biography
Komonchak was born in Nyack, New York in 1939. He attended Cathedral College in Brooklyn, and in 1960 received a Bachelor of Arts degree from Saint Joseph's Seminary in Dunwoodie, Yonkers. He studied at the North American College in Rome, earning a Licentiate of Sacred Theology from the Pontifical Gregorian University in Rome. One of his instructors at the Gregorian was Jesuit theologian Bernard Lonergan, whom Komonchak credited with restoring his faith in the future of Catholic intellectualism.

He received a doctorate from Union Theological Seminary in New York. Ordained in 1963, he did parish work along with college and seminary teaching, before joining the faculty at Catholic University of America in 1977; he had among his students Cardinal Tagle of Manila. He was considered by many as the dean of American ecclesiologists.

Komonchak is a leading interpreter of the Second Vatican Council, co-editor of the English version of the five-volume history of the Council, and the chief editor of The New Dictionary of Theology. In June 2015 he received from the Catholic Theological Society of America the John Courtney Murray Award, the highest honor it bestows.

He served as a consultant to three committees of the National Conference of Catholic Bishops, and published more than 150 articles.

References

External links 
 Lecture on the Second Vatican Council
 Chat Protocol of the Washington Post: J. A. Komonchak on the election of Pope Benedict XVI.
 At the pope's right hand: book review by JA Komonchak in the New York Times: J. Ratzinger, On the Situation of Faith, A Conversation with Vittorio Messori
 Komonchak's contribution to the theology of the local church.
 A Realist's Church: Essays in Honor of Joseph A.Komonchak

21st-century American Roman Catholic theologians
20th-century American Roman Catholic theologians
21st-century American Roman Catholic priests
20th-century American Roman Catholic priests
Catholic University of America faculty
1939 births
Ecclesiologists
Living people
People from Nyack, New York
Union Theological Seminary (New York City) alumni
Pontifical Gregorian University alumni
People of the Roman Catholic Archdiocese of New York